Classon's Bridge is a bridge over the River Dodder in Dublin, Ireland between Milltown and Dartry. The bridge is part of the Lower Churchtown Road (L3001) and has an underpass for pedestrians walking along the banks of the Dodder.

History
The bridge takes its name from John Classon, the owner of a mill, who built the bridge in order to aid his business which was located on the left bank of the river, now the location of the well known Dublin pub, The Dropping Well. The bridge was made from granite blocks on the river bed. In 1928 the bridge was widened but parts of the old bridge can still be seen underneath. A little upstream from the bridge is a statue of a Rhino in the middle of the river.

External links
https://www.youtube.com/watch?v=lDqHCudwv2s - video of Classon's bridge.

References

Bridges in Dublin (city)